Alexander Dubček (27 November 1921 – 7 November 1992) was a Slovak politician who served as the First Secretary of the Presidium of the Central Committee of the Communist Party of Czechoslovakia (KSČ) (de facto leader of Czechoslovakia) from January 1968 to April 1969. He oversaw significant reforms to the communist system during a period that became known as the Prague Spring, but his reforms were reversed and he was eventually sidelined following the Warsaw Pact invasion in August 1968.

Best known by the slogan, "Socialism with a human face", Dubček led a process that accelerated cultural and economic liberalization in Czechoslovakia. Reforms were opposed by conservatives inside the party who benefited from the Stalinist economy, as well as interests in the neighboring Soviet-bloc who feared contagion, western subversion, strategic vulnerability, and loss of institutional power. As a result, the country was invaded by half a million Soviet-led Warsaw Pact troops on 20–21 August 1968, intended to enable a coup by conservative forces. That coup, however, could not materialize due to lack of a viable pro-Soviet leadership and Dubček's continued extraordinary popularity. Soviet intervention ushered in a period of maneuver between conservatives and reformers where conservatives relied on Soviet influence to shift the balance of power, reversing reforms of the Prague Spring. 

Dubček was forced to resign as party head in April 1969, succeeded by Gustáv Husák, a former reformer and victim of Stalinism who was ambiguously favored by Moscow. This signaled the end of the Prague Spring and the beginning of normalization. Dubček was expelled from the Communist Party in 1970, amid a purge that expelled more than half the 1968 party membership, mostly from the younger generation of post-Stalin communists that he represented.

During the Velvet Revolution in 1989, Dubček served as the Chairman of the federal Czechoslovak parliament and contended for the presidency with Václav Havel. The European Parliament awarded Dubček the Sakharov Prize the same year. In the interim between the Prague Spring and the Velvet Revolution, Dubček withdrew from high politics but served as a leading inspiration and symbolic leader for Eurocommunism, maintaining intermittent contact with European reformers, especially in Italy and the Soviet Union. Also in 1989, just before his death, Andrei Sakharov would write, "I am convinced that the 'breath of freedom' which the Czechs and the Slovaks enjoyed when Dubček was their leader was a prologue to the peaceful revolutions now taking place in eastern Europe and Czechoslovakia itself." Sakharov credited Dubček and the Prague Spring as his inspiration.

At the time of his death in an automobile accident in 1992, Dubček remained an important political figure. Many saw him as the destined future president of newly-formed Slovakia. Since that time, his life and work have been significantly re-evaluated. This comes after long being over-shadowed by simplistic cold war narratives and rhetoric. According to Jan Adamec, an historical scholar based in Prague:

“I think there is a trend that became apparent around 2009, and became even more visible after Václav Havel’s death, which shows certain reconsideration of the period between 1968 and 1989. The picture is becoming more diverse, and is no longer as black and white as it was in the 1990s – the communist evil and the fearful, suppressed society. The picture is now gaining a variety of colours.”

Early life
Alexander Dubček was born in Uhrovec, Czechoslovakia (now in Slovakia), on 27 November 1921. When he was three years old, the family moved to the Soviet Union, in part to help build socialism and in part because jobs were scarce in Czechoslovakia; so that he was raised until 12 on a commune in Pishpek (now Bishkek), in the Kirghiz SSR of the Soviet Union (now Kyrgyzstan), as a member of the Esperantist and Idist industrial cooperative Interhelpo. In 1933, the family moved to Gorky, now Nizhny Novgorod, and in 1938 returned to Czechoslovakia.

During the Second World War, Dubček joined the underground resistance against the wartime pro-German Slovak state headed by Jozef Tiso. In August 1944, Dubček fought in the Jan Žižka partisan brigade during the Slovak National Uprising and was wounded twice, while his brother, Július, was killed.

Political career
During the war, Dubček joined the Communist Party of Slovakia (KSS), which had been created after the formation of the Slovak state and in 1948 was transformed into the Slovak branch of the Communist Party of Czechoslovakia (KSČ).

After the war, he steadily rose through the ranks in Communist Czechoslovakia. From 1951 to 1955 he was a member of the National Assembly, the parliament of Czechoslovakia. In 1953, he was sent to the Moscow Political College, where he graduated in 1958. In 1955, he joined the Central Committee of the Slovak branch and in 1962 became a member of the presidium. In 1958 he also joined the Central Committee of the Communist Party of Czechoslovakia, which he served as a secretary from 1960 to 1962 and as a member of the presidium after 1962. From 1960 to 1968 he once more was a member of the federal parliament.

In 1963, a power struggle in the leadership of the Slovak branch unseated Karol Bacílek and Pavol David, hard-line allies of Antonín Novotný, First Secretary of the KSČ and President of Czechoslovakia. In their place, a new generation of Slovak Communists took control of party and state organs in Slovakia, led by Dubček, who became First Secretary of the Slovak branch of the party.

Under Dubček's leadership, Slovakia was evolving toward political liberalization. Because Novotný and his Stalinist predecessors had denigrated Slovak "bourgeois nationalists", most notably Gustáv Husák and Vladimír Clementis, in the 1950s, the Slovak branch worked to promote Slovak identity. This mainly took the form of celebrations and commemorations, such as the 150th birthdays of 19th century leaders of the Slovak National Revival Ľudovít Štúr and Jozef Miloslav Hurban, the centenary of the Matica slovenská in 1963, and the twentieth anniversary of the Slovak National Uprising. At the same time, the political and intellectual climate in Slovakia became freer than that in the Czech lands. This was exemplified by the rising readership of Kultúrny život, the weekly newspaper of the Union of Slovak Writers, which published frank discussions of liberalization, federalization and democratization, written by the most progressive or controversial writers – both Slovak and Czech. Kultúrny život consequently became the first Slovak publication to gain a wide following among Czechs.

Prague Spring

The Czechoslovak economy began to plateau in the early 1960s. The one-size-fits all model of economic planning, better suited to the pre-industrialized Soviet Union of the 1930s, resulted in over-investment in heavy industry at the expense of light industry and consumer goods. Quantity was maximized regardless of costs, leading to poor quality and prices that were twice those of neighboring countries. Along with other economists, Ota Šik condemned the existing system of management as one that made further development impossible. Though production continued to grow, albeit slowly, in 1964 income began to fall. This forced then-president Antonín Novotný to begin making limited concessions to liberalize the strictly planned economy. This included allowing greater freedom to companies in setting prices and wages.  

Reforms only touched some sectors, and reforms were slow, which the regime tried to make up with increased imports. Liberalizing the centralized economy threatened those in the party bureaucracy who administered the old system, resulting in their sabotage and slowing of what reforms were voted. The cultural sphere liberalized the most completely and rapidly, but economy and national autonomy remained heavily centralized. The economic reforms touched on both the nationalities and the political question. Reforming how the economy operated was tied to how the party operated, and thinking evolved to recognize the need for a diversity of interests to be represented. 

Many were disappointed with the slow pace and limited scope of reforms, while the de-Stalinization program advanced by half-measures that left victims not fully reinstated. In September, 1967, Novotný's conservatives began to impose strict censorship on films and other culture products and institutions. This did not quiet opposition but only further provoked it.  

Following his presentation of grievances the month before, in October 1967 Dubček and Ota Šik challenged First Secretary Novotný's leadership style at a Central Committee meeting. Dubček said he acted like a dictator. Faced with lack of support at the central and local level of the party and large public demonstrations the last day of October that were badly mishandled, provoking further opposition, Novotný secretly invited Soviet leader Leonid Brezhnev to visit to Prague in December 1967. He had hoped to shore up his own position. 

In Prague, Brezhnev was stunned to learn of the extent of the opposition to Novotný. He decided not to interfere. This was read as a green-lighting for reform, but the KSC Presidium was deadlocked 5-5. In January, 1968, the question was turned over to the Czechoslovak Party Central Committee. They voted no confidence in Novotný by splitting the functions of the president and party leader. He remained president but was replaced by Dubček as First Secretary. Novotný resisted, attempting to mobilize elements of the army to prevent his loss of power. Ironically, investigation into this led to Novotný being removed from office completely a few months later. Investigations exposed a corruption scandal surrounding his own and his sons' shady business dealings.

Dubček, with his background and training in Russia, was seen by the USSR as a safe pair of hands. "Our Sasha", as Brezhnev called him. Aside from the immediate personal and professional animosity of Bulgarian leader, Todor Zhivkov, who refused to acknowledge him directly, other Warsaw Pact leaders sent customary congratulations. Zhivkov received a protest for this from Soviet diplomats. Zhivkov's behavior was not motivated by opposition to Dubček's program of reforms but his discomfort at the manner in which his predecessor had been removed.  Making no secret where he was headed, in February, with Brezhnev present, Dubček pledged: "We shall have to remove everything that strangles artistic and scientific creativeness." 

The period following Novotný's downfall became known as the Prague Spring. During this time, Dubček and other reformers sought to liberalize the Communist government—creating "socialism with a human face". Dubček and his allies’ aim was not a return to capitalism, nor was it an end to the Communist Party's rule or its leading role in society. It was socialism marked by, “internal democracy, unlimited and unconditioned by the party, the strengthening of the faith of the people and the working class, and its transformation into a revolutionary force and the creative power of the party.” To that end, the Prague Spring sought to liberalize the existing regime. It continued a series of reforms that granted greater freedom of expression to the press and public, rehabilitated victims of Stalinist purges under Klement Gottwald, advanced economic decentralization, and supported fundamental human rights reforms that included an independent judiciary.

During the Prague Spring, he and other reform-minded Communists sought to win popular support for the Communist government by eliminating its repressive features, allowing greater freedom of expression, and tolerating political and social organizations not under Communist control. "Dubček! Svoboda!" became the popular refrain of student demonstrations during this period, while a poll at home gave him 78-percent public support. 

Dubček declared a 10-year program to implement reforms, but as reforms gained momentum he struggled to both maintain control and move with events. Dubček had been a compromise candidate between more radical reformers and hard-line conservatives. In power, Dubček was caught between a hard-line minority in Czechoslovakia and their allies in other Warsaw Pact countries who pressured Dubček to rein in the Prague Spring, and on the other hand, more radical reformers who demanded more far-reaching and immediate reforms. While still stressing the leading role of the Party and the centrality of the Warsaw Pact, Dubček also was open to redefining the duty of party members from obedience to more creative expression. According to a CIA assessment at the time, Dubček was seen as an adept politician who might pull the balancing act off at home, but that only made Soviet military intervention more urgent for the anti-reform faction.

The Soviet leadership tried to slow down or stop the changes in Czechoslovakia through a series of negotiations. The Soviet Union agreed to bilateral talks with Czechoslovakia in July at Čierna nad Tisou, near the Slovak-Soviet border. At the meeting, Dubček tried to reassure the Soviets and the Warsaw Pact leaders that he was still friendly to Moscow, arguing that the reforms were an internal matter. He thought he had learned an important lesson from the failing of the Hungarian Revolution of 1956, in which the leaders had gone as far as withdrawing from the Warsaw Pact. Dubček believed that the Kremlin would allow him a free-hand in pursuing domestic reform as long as Czechoslovakia remained a faithful member of the Soviet bloc. 

Despite Dubček's continuing efforts to stress these commitments, Brezhnev and other Warsaw Pact leaders remained alarmed. Because so much of the motive was hidden behind clandestine activities, personal motives, and organizational biases, where even pro-intervention hard-liners had to make appearances so as not to be charged with treason, there was and remains confusion as to Soviet motives for the invasion that ended the Prague Spring. 

Some believed that the Soviet's saw even a partly free press as threatening an end to one-party rule in Czechoslovakia, and (by extension) elsewhere in Eastern Europe. This is contradicted by many eye-witnesses, such as Ken Coates:

"When the Russians in ’68 suspected, or made the accusation, that the Communist Party was losing control, the counter-revolutionary groups and elements were misusing the ’68 reforms in order to undermine the Party position, it was laughable. Anyone who was in Prague and lived in Czechoslovakia at that time knew that the Party’s authority, the Party’s position in the eyes of the nation had improved for the first time. In fact, it was more or less the second time. They had very good support after the last war for various reasons, unlike in many other East European countries, and this aspect is too often underestimated in Western countries. The Communist Party in the ’46 election was really the strongest party ... But the situation has changed now very much. The Party discredited itself. The support the Party rallied behind itself in August 1968 is the kind of support, I think, that will never happen again."

Press freedom does not explain events, either in the Soviet Union or Czechoslovakia. It has become a powerful narrative though, in part because the cold warriors wanted to avoid a real explanation of the crisis. What began as an opening to reassessment of the Stalinist purges and the nation's historic past grew into an abstract ideal as conservative criticism generalized and mounted. The question had been one more of truth-telling than of press-freedom. The issues were more broad. Confusion was common. At the time of the invasion, events caught much of the world by surprise, despite widespread evidence of troop buildups and continued seeming arbitrary maneuvers on the country's borders. In an emergency meeting of the US National Security Council called by President Johnson on 20 August, Secretary Clifford, along with the cabinet and president could not explain Soviet actions. The invasion also erupted alongside so many destabilizing changes that some have pointed to 'press freedom' serving as a short-cut explanation.

In a letter written in 1974 to the widow of Josef Smrkovsky, a close political ally who died in official political disgrace that January, Dubček said he remained unable to explain why the Soviet leadership believed "distorted reports" about the nature and aims of his socialist reforms. He said that these urgent warnings to the Soviet leadership were the result of party leaders and other conservatives who, “saw all that was happening solely from the angle of the loss of their leading role in the party.”

Anti-reformist events were driven by a coalition of hard-liners in the Soviet Union, such as Yuri Andropov, whose false reports of events in Hungary had also helped overcome Khrushchev's opposition to intervention, and Warsaw Pact leaders fearing for their own positions such as East German leader, Walter Ulbricht, and Polish leader, Wladyslaw Gomulka. Perhaps most significantly, these reports included letters secretly passed directly to the Soviet Politburo by those within the Czechoslovakian regime who promoted intervention. 

One such message was sent to Brezhnev at the time of the Čierna nad Tisou meeting. These letters and reports were sent by a group of anti-reformist hard-liners in the Czechoslovak Communist Party (KSC), under the leadership of Slovak Communist Party chief, Vasil Bil’ak, working with allies in the StB and Czechoslovak Army. Bil’ak later wrote in his own memoirs that what he and his colleagues feared most, right up until mid-August, was that Dubček would reach an accommodation of compromise with Moscow that would forestall or prevent an invasion. Bil’ak himself feared his own imminent departure from office with good reason. His hard deadlines were August 26 was the date of the Slovak Party Congress, and August 20 gathering the reformist leadership, which had been moved up to allow reformers to secure better positions. The warnings of Bil’ak and his supporters stoked deliberately exaggerated fears of violent "anti-socialist counter-revolution" as an "imminent threat". This was not only to prod the Soviets to quick action but to ensure that Dubček would be removed and not even a moderate reformist government would remain to frustrate their personal prerogatives. Press freedom was only one of many reforms where no compromise at all could be tolerated.

"Fraternal Intervention" 

On the night of 20–21 August 1968, military forces from several Warsaw Pact member states (Albania, Romania and East Germany did not participate) invaded Czechoslovakia. Soviet media cited a call for help from unnamed representatives as the cause of the "fraternal intervention", publishing an unidentified appeal as proof on 22 August, 1968; However, as it became clear from the first day that virtually the entire responsible leadership of the Czechoslovakian government and communist parties, including Dubček, were being blamed as causes of the invasion, and even the Soviet-supported leadership fell into accusations against each other, even most allied communist parties around the world rejected the Soviet pretext as a thin disguise for gross violation of national party autonomy. Even President Svoboda had publicly issued a statement calling on occupying forces to withdraw and reforms to continue, while Czechoslovakia's UN representative was calling for international support against the invasion.

The Soviets were only partly responsible for this confusion.  Following closely with the long telephone conversation between Bil’ak and Brezhnev on 10 August, two of Bil’ak's most important allies, met with the Soviet ambassador to Czechoslovakia on 14-15 August. Alois Indra, who along with Drahomir Kolder had been in direct contact with the Soviet Politburo, was accompanied by another KSC hard-liner, Oldrich Pavlovsky, in their meeting with ambassador Stepan Chernovenko. They gave assurances that as soon as Soviet "troops move into action on the night of 20 August," the "healthy forces" in the KSC would proceed with their "plan of action" to oust Dubček and set up a "provisional revolutionary government of workers and peasants." Indra said he could "guarantee" that a majority of the KSC Presidium, the KSC Central Committee, the National Assembly, and the Czechoslovak government would formally align themselves with the "healthy forces." He promised six of the eleven members of the KSC Presidium and 50 additional members of the KSC Central Committee as supporters. 

While the Soviet Politburo received many such appeals, misleading them into confidence the viability of a hard-liner government in waiting, the KGB had also buried reports that the US and the Federal Republic of Germany were not behind the Prague Spring. KBG Station Chief in Washington DC, Oleg Kalugin, only discovered years later that the KGB leadership had ordered his reports destroyed and not shown to anyone after he gave a more balanced assessment. Meanwhile, KGB reports to the Soviet leadership went to lengths to support the official narrative and the claims of anti-reform hard-liners by blaming every negative incident in Czechoslovakia on the Prague Spring, including in some cases traffic accidents, fires, and burglaries. The KGB even manufactured evidence, directing agents to plant cashes of American-made weapons near the German border in order to be discovered, and they instructed agents to hang posters calling for the overthrow of communism. This was to prove a western-sponsored network was active in Dubček's reforms as part of an imminent insurrection or coup. 

The KGB had many reasons for its actions, but most important may have been its institutional bias. The Pillar Commission set up to investigate the show trials of the 1950s recommended the disbandment of the secret police, and Czechoslovakian security services had already ceased most cooperation with the KGB, having a major impact on the KGBs operational effectiveness and influence. Some suggest further that they may have feared eventual reprisals against their most active and loyal agents within the StB and Interior Ministry. This motive is partly supported by the guarantees against reprisals against pro-Soviet Czechoslovakians in the Moscow Protocols. Only a few in the Kremlin voiced skepticism, such as Gennadii Voronov, who asked,  “Whom was it really so necessary for us to defend, and from whom?”

Bil’ak would join Indra in reassuring the Soviets, promising that Kolder would be ready to be voted the KSC First Secretary when Soviet troops arrived. When two of their promised allies on the Presidium, Jan Piller and Frantisek Barbirek, opposed the invasion and supported Dubček, Soviet plans had to be abandoned. This forced them to retain Dubček and his government until the following year, when Dubček's government could no longer contain growing pressure outside the party to advance reforms once again.

The occupying armies quickly seized control of Prague and the Central Committee's building, taking Dubček and other reformers into Soviet custody. But, before they were arrested, Dubček urged the people not to resist militarily, on the grounds that "presenting a military defense would have meant exposing the Czech and Slovak peoples to a senseless bloodbath". Already the previous month, when officers under General Vaclav Prchlik, head of the KSC's military department, began preparing contingency plans for a Soviet/Warsaw Pact invasion, Dubček had immediately vetoed its implementation. In the early hours of the attack, Czechoslovakian radio broadcast an appeal to citizens not to resist. The presidium of the Central Committee of the Communist Party of Czechoslovakia asked, “all citizens of the Republic to keep the peace and not resist the advancing armies, because the defense of our state borders is now impossible”. 

The non-violent resistance of the Czech and Slovak population, which delayed total loss of control to the Warsaw Pact forces for a full eight months (in contrast to the Soviet military's estimate of four days), became a prime example of civilian-based defense. A latter-day The Good Soldier Švejk (referring to an early-20th-century Czech satirical novel) wrote of "the comradely pranks of changing street names and road signs, of pretending not to understand Russian, and of putting out a great variety of humorous welcoming posters". Meanwhile, radio stations called for the invaders to return home: "Long live freedom, Svoboda, Dubček". 

Later on the day of the invasion, Dubček and several others were taken to Moscow on a Soviet military transport aircraft. On 24 August, Soviet representatives presented the Moscow Protocol. Rejecting a counter-proposal offered by Dubček's aides, they said it was non-negotiable. The only alternative was Soviet imposition of a military dictatorship now that their illusions of being welcomed as liberators proved false. Though Dubček's team gained minor concessions, they were forced to agree with only František Kriegel refusing to sign. This ended the Prague Spring and set the stage for a Moscow-directed reversal of reforms Dubček was compelled to sell and implement.

Dubček and most of the reformers were returned to Prague on 27 August. At the time, the Moscow Protocol was intended to be a secret document, though it was revealed the subsequent week, first to party members and then leaked to the New York Times. Dubček and other senior leaders were called back to Moscow repeatedly to receive new demands, which they returned home to deliver to their people. This led Dubček to consider quitting under extreme duress at times, but he always recovered. The Soviets made no attempt to hide their contempt. When Dubček protested that he had already met the demands of the Moscow Protocol, Soviet President Nikolai Podgorny told him to shut up. They were told that the Soviets would continue to turn the screws harder, undeterred by the protests of other communist parties; They dismissed them saying, "For the next 30 or 40 years, socialism has no chance in the capitalist West." Gustav Husák reported they were treated as "scoundrels"

In January 1969, Dubček was hospitalized in Bratislava complaining of a cold and had to cancel a speech. Rumors sprang up that his illness was radiation sickness and that it was caused by radioactive strontium being placed in his soup during his stay in Moscow in an attempt to kill him. However, a U.S. intelligence report discounted this for lack of evidence.

Dubček was forced to resign as First Secretary in April 1969, following the Czechoslovak Hockey Riots. The Soviets were not only alarmed by Dubček's failure to contain growing pressure to resume reforms but their own failures to consolidate a neo-Stalinist regime under Indra or their other allies. Dubček was replaced by Gustav Husák, beginning a process of 'normalization' that would purge most of the party and de-politicize the country. At the time, Leonid Brezhnev is supposed to have said: 'If we cannot find the puppets, then we will tie the strings to the leaders.' 

Having been re-elected to the Federal Assembly (as the federal parliament was renamed in 1969), Dubček became chairman on April 28; However, he was removed from office on October 15 under Prime Minister Cernik's new government the month prior. Though Cernik tried to placate reformists, the new government's extreme anti-reform faction, led by Deputy Party Chief Lubomir Strougal, wanted to put Dubček on trial. Husák, a post-ideological 'realist', as well as Moscow, wanted to avoid a destabilizing return to Stalinism.

Instead, Dubček was sent into diplomatic exile to Turkey. There, he went from head of a nation of millions to heading a 7-person staff that was conveniently out of the country while more aggressive purges began in earnest. Some suggested at the time that the right-wing Turkish government, which would ban the communists in 1971, would be more reliable in keeping an eye on him than anywhere in the Soviet-bloc, where he was widely regarded as a hero and they often did not trust their own people. Husák was also said to have feared that direct persecution of Dubček might stir more instability than it would promote. Others suggested that Husák's reluctance to trials and executions was because of his own experiences as a prisoner, though he himself denied having any problem with imprisoning or killing state enemies on general principle or personal feeling. Alan Levy traced Husák's reluctance to the same reason that Hungary was able to relax its repressive grip within less than 5 years after the Soviet invasion, but Czechoslovakia and its former leaders remained in a state of limbo rather than hell that would eventually last for decades because unlike Hungary, Czechoslovakia had no real revolt to liquidate. Instead, he and the Soviets had to invent a counter-revolution and counter-revolutionary leadership.  

However, in June of that same year, Dubček was summarily dismissed from his ambassadorial post and recalled from Turkey after being suspended from the party pending an investigation by hard-liners. This was read as a signal that Husák had lost a behind-the-scenes power-struggle against the extremist faction led by Strougal, Indra, and Balik. They had taken control of the Presidium by a margin of 7 to 4, voting to prepare a series of trials against reformers on charges of espionage, sedition, and slander of the republic. Ironically, Dubček's and his reformer allies' fates may have been spared by the chance accident that saved Husák from removal himself. After the death of Jaroslav Trojan, a member of the presidium of the Federal Assembly, in drunk-driving accident, a routine search of his residence turned up evidence of a conspiracy by ultra-antiliberals to remove Husák. This resulted in the removal of hard-liners who were pushing for new rounds of show trials. As a result, Dubček found himself a permanent free-range prisoner, along with many others purged from the party and blacklisted from work. 

The purge of the party resulted in a general decline in membership from 1.6 million at the time that Dubček rose to power to 880,000 by the end of 1970. Even among these members, many either refused their cards or had not paid their dues. The reduction in numbers was accompanied by a qualitative change in the party, where the party that Dubček headed as leader of the post-Stalinist generation of idealists was gone. The majority of members were over 60 years old, and ideology had virtually disappeared, even among conservatives. Dubček and his communist reformers had proven so popular that the only way to root them out of the political fabric of the nation was to eradicated communist ideology. Even Czechoslovakian universities ceased to teach Marxism for lack of 'reliable' instructors. Any kind of political belief, in rapid succession, would be grounds for suspicion, leaving a disaffected population.

For Dubček and many others, this did not mean a return to a private life but a different kind of political life, where in Dubček's case, his career in high politics would be deferred at home while he served as an inspirational symbol of eurocommunist ideals abroad. Outwardly, he shifted to menial work that many educated reformers were forced to take, first turning down a post at a Slovak social-security agency that could be used to implicate him in misappropriation of funds. He instead requested to work as a forester. This was refused, but he was eventually given a clerical job with the state forestry agency in Bratislava. In this way, the regime sought to isolate people in order cultivate passive indifference toward politics.

Exile in Bratislava 
 
After his expulsion from the party, Dubček became a nonperson whose very mention was banned. In 1988 he told Voice of America that what he had been through could not be described as "life" in the normal sense of the word, but rather a matter of survival.  Interpretations at the end of the cold war treated him as a man who would lose relevancy due to prolonged isolation in an enforced private life. In fact, his life became anything but private. Perhaps he simply outlived the narrative that had confined him as much the police surveillance and menial job insecurity, and that left some confused. Perhaps the new generation of the Velvet Revolution could not acknowledge that they merely built on what was before.  

While the first news reports during the normalization period, 1970-75, show a man who actively avoided attention and was shifting uncertainly between insecure employment; Telling a West German photographer: “Please, sir. Please, sir, if you like to help me come not to me.” And school girls giggling and saying all they are told at school was that he had done something bad. Other reports saw him as a man living securely but anonymously with his wife and children in a comfortable villa in a nice neighborhood in Bratislava. This seems to have been the official fable. As the German publication reported, Dubček was eventually given a job as chief of the motor pool in the Regional Forestry Administration, and then worked as a forester. Following the pattern of other purged party members, he was then demoted to a less visible and responsible job planting trees. When Dutch journalists tried to visit his house in August, 1975, they found it guarded by three soldiers with sub-machine guns. Even before that, in 1974, after he was denied the right to bury his mother in daylight for fear it would provoke an anti-government demonstration, Dubček broke his silence by publishing letters he smuggled out of the country.  

These letters and other communications went through sister communist parties and media. The leader of the Prague Spring in fact had much in common with the Eurocommunist tendencies and common challenges in the countries of east and west caught between the super-powers, but seeking to both heal the division of Europe and gain autonomy from the influence of the great powers. Eurocommunism sought to unify the European labor movement and participate fully in parliamentary democracy. Not only did this bring them into direct conflict with the Soviet Union during the crackdown against the Solidarity trade union, but they had been in open disagreement with Moscow over the invasion of Czechoslovakia. Dubček had a long history of contact with not only the Italian communist party but with its newspaper l'Unita and its journalists. A highly favorable article about him in L'Unità, on June 29, 1970, reporting his expulsion from the party, portrayed him as a social democratic communist seeking to change the ruling style of the party. He struck of popular cord with Italian audiences and remained a popular symbol of shared ideals.  Under constant surveillance and separated from his domestic contacts, it was actually easier for him to make contact with western communist media and parties than with his own party and people. He saw this use of intermediaries as the natural course of action, stating in a letter to the Italian Communist Party: 

"Since the matter of the political path in the Communist Party has become international, it cannot remain internal at this time. After the expulsion of almost 600,000 communists from the party and their civil and social disenfranchisement to our laws and the Constitution of the Czechoslovakia, the crisis in the party deepened even more. A gradual starting point can only come with the help of other communist parties of socialist countries and other communist parties, especially European ones...Helping other communist parties cannot be understood as interfering in the internal affairs of another communist party, because it has long since become an international matter." 

The establishment of Charter 77 would add even more weight to his cause as an international one. 

When American president Reagan re-escalated the cold war by deployment of medium range nuclear missiles on European soil, it evoked the same questions as drove the Soviet military to an institutional bias in favor of invasion. Dubček's government was resisting Soviet pressure to station Soviet nuclear weapons for launch from its soil. Just as in the west, this was seen in the east as a surrender of an independent foreign policy by giving the super-power the ability to launch a nuclear attack from their soil without the host nation having any say in the matter. 

His relationship with Italian communists would lead to his first direct public interview, which prodded the University of Bologna into offering him an honorary doctorate as a man who could bridge the differences between the east and west. His trip to Italy in 1988, and the public recognition he gained from both the timing and prestige of an award he shared with Nelson Mandela marked his return to high politics as perestroika was finally breaking though to the Soviet bloc nations outside the Soviet Union. This led directly to his rehabilitation as well as return to public life. Immediately after receiving the award, Dubček was congratulated by Rudolf Slansky, Jr., who pointed to his importance as, "not only a symbol of the Prague Spring, but also a symbol of inevitable changes in Czechoslovakia and a real political alternative." 

In 1989, he was awarded the annual Sakharov Prize in its second year of existence.

Velvet Revolution

During the Velvet Revolution of 1989, he supported the Public Against Violence (VPN) and the Civic Forum. On the night of 24 November, Dubček appeared with Václav Havel on a balcony overlooking Wenceslas Square, where he was greeted with tremendous applause from the throngs of protesters below and embraced as a symbol of democratic freedom. Several onlookers even chanted, "Dubček na hrad!" ("Dubček to the Castle"—i.e., Dubček for President). He disappointed the crowd somewhat by calling the revolution a chance to continue the work he had started 20 years earlier to prune out what was wrong with Communism. Later that night, Dubček was on stage with Havel at the Laterna Magika theatre, the headquarters of Civic Forum, when the entire leadership of the Communist Party resigned, in effect ending Communist rule in Czechoslovakia.

Dubček was elected Chairman of the Federal Assembly (the Czechoslovak Parliament) on 28 December 1989, and re-elected in 1990 and 1992.

At the time of the dismantling of Communist party rule, Dubček described the Velvet Revolution as a victory for his humanistic socialist outlook. In 1990, he received the International Humanist Award from the International Humanist and Ethical Union. He also gave the commencement address to the graduates of the Class of 1990 at The American University in Washington, D.C.; it was his first trip to the United States.

In 1992, he became leader of the Social Democratic Party of Slovakia and represented that party in the Federal Assembly. At that time, Dubček passively supported the union between Czechs and Slovaks in a single Czecho-Slovak federation against the ultimately successful push towards an independent Slovak state.

Death

Dubček died on 7 November 1992, as a result of injuries sustained in a car crash that took place on 1 September on the Czech D1 highway, near Humpolec, 20 days short of his 71st birthday. He was buried in Slávičie údolie cemetery in Bratislava, Slovakia. His death remained a question of social and political theories alleging involvement by either then–Prime Minister of Slovakia Vladimír Mečiar or KGB. None of the theories were confirmed by subsequent investigation.

Legacy and cultural representations
In 1984, French singer and songwriter Alice Dona had released a song named Le Jardinier de Bratislava with the lyrics written by Claude Lemesle, as an apolitical song about love and longing for freedom. The song was inspired by a trip of a French television crew to visit Dubček in his villa near Slavín, Bratislava. They were denied the access by the ŠtB secret police. The sole footage collected of Dubček was of him attending to his garden.

The movie titled Dubček, released in 2018, is the first film based on the life of Alexander Dubček. It is a Slovak historical movie whose main plot revolves around events related to the Warsaw Pact invasion.

References

External links

 Alexander Dubček profile on the Sakharov Prize Network
 Dubcek: Dubcek and Czechoslovakia 1918–1968 by William Shawcross (1970)
Hope Dies Last The Autobiography of Alexander Dubcek by Alexander Dubcek (Author), Jiří Hochman (Editor, Translator), Kodansha Europe (1993), .

1921 births
1992 deaths
Former Marxists
People from Bánovce nad Bebravou District
Leaders of the Communist Party of Czechoslovakia
Public Against Violence politicians
Social Democratic Party of Slovakia politicians
Members of the National Assembly of Czechoslovakia (1948–1954)
Members of the National Assembly of Czechoslovakia (1960–1964)
Members of the National Assembly of Czechoslovakia (1964–1968)
Members of the Chamber of the People of Czechoslovakia (1969–1971)
Members of the Chamber of the Nations of Czechoslovakia (1986–1990)
Members of the Chamber of the Nations of Czechoslovakia (1990–1992)
Members of the Chamber of the Nations of Czechoslovakia (1992)
Ambassadors of Czechoslovakia to Turkey
Communist Party of Slovakia (1939) politicians
Slovak humanists
Slovak Esperantists
Czechoslovak democracy activists
Slovak democracy activists
Czechoslovak military personnel of World War II
Prague Spring
People of the Cold War
People of the Velvet Revolution
Recipients of the Order of the White Lion
Road incident deaths in the Czech Republic
Deaths from multiple organ failure
Sakharov Prize laureates